João Costa Menezes is a London-based Portuguese film actor, film producer and film director.

After a degree in law by the University of Coimbra and three years working as a lawyer in Portugal, João decided to move to London in 1998, to follow an acting career. He got his first acting job in 1999, in the BBC series Sunburn, playing Luis. After that, he appeared in series such as Gormenghast and Jonathan Creek.

In London, he took a film course at the London Film School and a few workshops at Raindance . 
His first short film as a director, actor and producer Zero, was shot in London in 2000. It was awarded a special prize at the Huesca Short Film Festival, Spain.
In 2001 he directed his first feature film, Akasha, a no-budget film shot in video, distributed in Russia, nominated for the Méliès d'Argent 2001. It was premiered in the United States of America at the Atlanta Film Festival. 
In 2004 he directed his first music video Melancholic Ballad (for the Left Lovers), for The Fingertips, which became number 1 at Sic Radical and got the Best Music Video Award at the Arouca Film Festival.

João Got his Unarmed & Rapier and Dagger certification by the British Academy of Stage and Screen Combat in June 2005. He has done stunts in Kiss Kiss (Bang Bang) and played a Roman Soldier in Gladiator.

In 2007 he directed the short film Remember My Dream, with the English model Jakki Degg. 
In 2008 he directed Mulheres, Bah!, premiered at the Fantasporto Film Festival and presented at the 2008 Cannes Short Film Corner, a short film with London's West End singer and actress Madalena Alberto.

Menezes does also voice-over, having done the voice of a fly in Serial Killer and the 2007 Portugal campaign for Apple Inc.

In addition to acting and filmmaking, João Costa Menezes is also a qualified tennis instructor by the United States Professional Tennis Registry.

Filmography (director/producer) 
2010 – Loucura
2009 – Fado
2008 – Mulheres, Bah!
2007 – Remember my dream
2006 – Agur
2004 – Serial Killer
2001 – Akasha
2000 – Zero

Filmography (actor) 
2008 – Mulheres, Bah! (voice-over)
2005 – Perfect Day
2005 – Incessant
2004 – Serial Killer
2004 – Armed for Glory
2004 – Quality Indigo
2003 – Somnis entre boires
2001 – Akasha
2000 – Zero
2000 – Kiss Kiss (Bang Bang)
1999 – Honest
1999 – Gladiator
1999 – Jonathan Creek (TV)
1999 – Gormenghast (TV)
1999 – Tube Tales
1999 – Sunburn (TV)

Filmography (crew) 
2006 – Dirty Bomb (1st AD)
2006 – On The Other Side (2d AD)
2005 – Charlie (Production Assistant)
2005 – The Poker Academy (camera assistant)
1998 – Waves Without Sound (Script Supervisor)
1998 – The Maddest Man (Sound Assistant)

External links

People from Porto
Portuguese male film actors
Portuguese film directors
Portuguese film editors
Portuguese film producers
Portuguese cinematographers
Portuguese screenwriters
Male screenwriters
Portuguese male writers
Living people
University of Coimbra alumni
Year of birth missing (living people)